Henley Beach was an electoral district of the House of Assembly in the Australian state of South Australia from 1970 to 1993.

Henley Beach was abolished in a boundary redistribution in 1993, superseded by the electoral district of Colton.

Members

Election results

References

External links
1985 & 1989 election boundaries, page 18 & 19

Former electoral districts of South Australia
1970 establishments in Australia
1993 disestablishments in Australia
Constituencies established in 1970
Constituencies disestablished in 1993